Deborah Bassett (born 7 December 1965) is an Australian rower.

Bassett competed at the 1986 Commonwealth Games where she won a gold medal in the eights event and a silver medal in the coxed four event.

References

1965 births
Living people
Australian female rowers
Rowers at the 1986 Commonwealth Games
Commonwealth Games medallists in rowing
Commonwealth Games gold medallists for Australia
Commonwealth Games silver medallists for Australia
20th-century Australian women
21st-century Australian women
Medallists at the 1986 Commonwealth Games